Annakeera Crossing was a level crossing near Annaghmore in County Armagh, Northern Ireland. By 1938 it was also a railway request halt.

History
The Great Northern Railway opened the halt on its Portadown — Omagh line. The Ulster Transport Authority took over the GNR's remaining lines in Northern Ireland in 1958 and closed the halt in 1960.

References

 
 

Disused railway stations in County Armagh
Railway stations opened in 1938
Railway stations closed in 1960
Great Northern Railway (Ireland)
Railway stations in Northern Ireland opened in the 20th century